Roßleithen is a municipality in the district of Kirchdorf an der Krems in the Austrian state of Upper Austria.

Geography
Roßleithen lies in the Traunviertel. About 61 percent of the municipality is forest, and 20 percent is farmland.

References

Cities and towns in Kirchdorf an der Krems District